Patricia Smith Yaeger (February 25, 1949 – July 25, 2014) was an American academic and literary critic.

Biography
Yaeger studied at Bryn Mawr College, receiving her BA in 1972; she took a Ph. D. at Yale University in 1980. She began her teaching career with posts at Williams College, the University of Pennsylvania, and Harvard University before becoming an associate professor at the University of Michigan in 1990; she was promoted to professor in 1999, and named the Henry Simmons Frieze Collegiate Professor of English and Women's Studies in 2005. At the time of her death from ovarian cancer she was researching the concept of the "female sublime". Yaeger died at her home. She was survived by her husband and two children. Yaeger received the Faculty Recognition Award from the University of Michigan in 2001.

Publications
From 2006 until 2011, she edited the journal Publications of the Modern Language Association. She is the author of Honey-Mad Women: Emancipatory Strategies in Women's Writing (1988), The Geography of Identity (1996), and Dirt and Desire: Reconstructing Southern Women's Writing 1930-1990 (2000).

References

External links
 Patricia Smith Yaeger Papers, Pembroke Center Archives, Brown University

1949 births
2014 deaths
Deaths from ovarian cancer
American academics of English literature
American women academics
Bryn Mawr College alumni
Yale University alumni
Williams College faculty
University of Pennsylvania faculty
Harvard University faculty
University of Michigan faculty
American literary critics
Women literary critics
20th-century American non-fiction writers
20th-century American women writers
21st-century American non-fiction writers
21st-century American women writers
American women non-fiction writers
American women critics